XHUSS-FM is a radio station on 92.3 FM in Hermosillo, Sonora. The station is owned by Grupo ACIR and carries its Amor romantic music format.

History
XHUSS was originally located in Ures, Sonora on 95.1 MHz. It received its concession on August 16, 1994 and was owned by Jorge Torio Castellanos.

It moved to Hermosillo in the late 1990s and changed frequencies to 92.3.

References

Radio stations in Sonora
Radio stations established in 1994
Grupo ACIR
1994 establishments in Mexico